Caffeic aldehyde is a phenolic aldehyde contained in the seeds of Phytolacca americana (American pokeweed).

See also 
 Caffeic acid
 Caffeyl alcohol

References

External links 
 Knapsack

Phenylpropanoids
Conjugated aldehydes
Catechols
Vinylogous carboxylic acids